Mozaffar Hossain is a Bangladeshi engineer, entrepreneur, businessman and politician. He takes responsibility as an incumbent member of parliament in Jatio Shongshod representing Jamalpur.

Education
In childhood he studied in sontia high school ,Mozaffar Hossain earned his college graduation degree in Bachelor of Science in Textiles Technology discipline from the then College of Textile Engineering and Technology, which is now BUTEX.

Career
Mozaffar Hossain started as a businessman in his early career. He founded a spinning industry after taking the path of entrepreneurship, and soon after made the company a public entity. He got elected for the parliament from Jamalpur-5 seat as a candidate with BAL's nomination on 30 December 2018.

References

Awami League politicians
Living people
11th Jatiya Sangsad members
1957 births
Bangladesh University of Textiles alumni